Autrey Lane Howell (born July 28, 1941) is a former American football player who played defensive tackle for seven seasons in the National Football League. His career started in 1963 for the New York Giants, where he played for 2 seasons after which played on the Philadelphia Eagles for another 5 seasons before retiring.

References 

1941 births
Living people
Sportspeople from Monroe, Louisiana
Players of American football from Louisiana
American football defensive tackles
Grambling State Tigers football players
New York Giants players
Philadelphia Eagles players